Reading Rowing Club is a rowing club, on the River Thames in England, on the Berkshire bank at Reading close to the town centre just above Caversham Bridge, the westerly bridge in the town on the reach above Caversham Lock.
 
The club was founded in 1867 at Reading where there had been an interest in rowing for several years. After its foundation the club revived the  Reading Amateur Regatta and has been the driving force behind it ever since. The club was particularly successful at Henley Royal Regatta in the 1930s.

Membership and activities
The only non-academic rowing club in Reading, Goring Gap Rowing Club is the nearest such club and is a semi-rival, in the west of Mapledurham, as that club take part in events for the non-racing, recreational side of the sport.  Reading RC organises adult beginner coaching and provides events for the competitive and recreational sides of the sport.

The present boathouse was built in 1989 replacing a succession of earlier sites.

Honours

Henley Royal Regatta

British champions

See also
Rowing on the River Thames

References

External links
 Reading Rowing Club official website

Sports clubs established in 1867
Rowing clubs of the River Thames
Sport in Reading, Berkshire
Rowing in Berkshire
Organisations based in Reading, Berkshire
Sport in Oxfordshire